General Sir Reginald Byng Stephens,  (10 October 1869 – 6 April 1955) was a British Army general of the First World War and later Commandant of the Royal Military College, Sandhurst, from 1919 to 1923, Major-General commanding the 4th Division, 1923 to 1926, and finally Director-General of the Territorial Army, 1927 to 1931.

Early life
The son of Captain Frederick Stephens JP, late the 2nd Regiment of Life Guards, of Bentworth Lodge, Alton, Hampshire, by his marriage on 13 January 1869 to Cecilia Mary, daughter of Captain H. Byng RN, of Quendon Hall, Essex, Stephens was educated at Winchester College. His sister, Mabel, was born and died in 1870, and he also had five younger brothers, Berkeley, Lionel, Gerald Edmund, Evelyn Edward, and Frederick Geoffrey, and a second sister, Cicely Mary.

Military career
Stephens trained at the Royal Military College, Sandhurst, from where he was commissioned into the Rifle Brigade as a Second Lieutenant on 9 April 1890. 

He was promoted lieutenant on 13 February 1892 and captain on 26 July 1897. He served in Matabeleland in the Second Matabele War in 1896-1897 and in the Nile Expedition of 1898. From late 1899 he served in South Africa in the Second Boer War of 1899–1902, during which he was severely wounded, was three times mentioned in despatches (including 25 April 1902 "for his conduct of a successful attack on a Boer laager of 25 January 1901, and for general good service"), promoted brevet major on 29 November 1900, and received the Queen's South Africa Medal with three clasps and the King's Medal with two clasps. Following the end of the war, he left Port Natal on the SS Malta in late September 1902, together with other officers and men of the 2nd battalion Rifle Brigade who were transferred to Egypt.

He served in the European War of 1914 to 1918, when he was three more times mentioned in despatches. He began the war as commanding officer of the 2nd Battalion the Rifle Brigade (1914–15), was promoted Brevet Colonel, appointed a Companion of the Order of St Michael and St George and of the Order of the Bath and promoted temporary Brigadier and then temporary Major-General. On 1 April 1916 he took over the command of the 5th Division. In December, 1917, he led the 5th Division to Italy as part of the British participation in the Italian campaign.

He was Commander of X Corps from 1918 to 1919, when he was made a Knight of the Bath, then was Commandant of the Royal Military College, Sandhurst, from 1919 to 1923; Major-General commanding the 4th Division, 1923 to 1926; and Director-General of the Territorial Army, 1927 to 1931. Promoted Lieutenant General in 1925 and General in 1930, Stephens retired the service in 1931. He settled in Gloucestershire, where he was appointed a Justice of the Peace and a Deputy Lieutenant for the county.

Marriage
On 10 August 1905, Stephens married Eleanore Dorothea, the younger daughter of Edmund William Cripps, of Ampney Park, Cirencester, and they had one son and two daughters.

Their son, Frederick Stephens, was born on 19 June 1906. He followed his father into the Rifle Brigade, during the Second World War commanded its 1st Battalion in the Western Desert and Tunisia, and retired as a Brigadier in 1959, when he was appointed CBE.<ref>'Stephens,
Frederick' in British Army Officers 1939-1945 at unithistories.com, accessed 31 May 2011</ref>

Their daughter, Air Commandant Dame Anne Stephens (4 November 1912 – 26 July 2000), was Director of the WRAF from 1960 until her retirement in 1963.

Honours
Companion of the Order of St Michael and St George, 1916
Croix de Guerre, Belgium
Croix de guerre and Legion of Honour, France, 1919London Gazette, 21 August 1919 (Supplement), p. 10606
Order of St Maurice and St Lazarus, Italy
Companion of the Order of the Bath, 1918
Knight Commander of the Order of the Bath, 1919

ArmsOr, on a chevron engrailed azure between two demi-lions in chief and a griffin segreant in base gules, three cross-crosslets of the field''.

References

|-
 

|-
 

|-

|-
 

1869 births
1955 deaths
British Army generals
People educated at Winchester College
Knights Commander of the Order of the Bath
Companions of the Order of St Michael and St George
Deputy Lieutenants of Gloucestershire
English justices of the peace
Rifle Brigade officers
Commandants of Sandhurst
Graduates of the Royal Military College, Sandhurst
People of the Second Matabele War
British Army generals of World War I
British Army personnel of the Second Boer War
Burials in Gloucestershire